Faiza is a female Arabic name meaning "successful, victorious, beneficial". Variants include: Faizah, Faiza, Fayzah, Fayza, Faeyza, Faeyzah, Faihza, Faaiza, Faaizah, Fiza, Faisa, Fayeza, Fayiza, Faeeza.; and related to the male names Faiz, Faizan, and Fayez. Faiza (فائزة) is derived from its root word Fa'iz (فائز) which means successful. 

Notable people with the name include:

 Faiza Ambah, Saudi Arabian journalist
 Faiza Darkhani (c. 1992), Afghani environmentalist, women's rights activist, and educator
 Faiza Rauf (1923–1994), Egyptian royal
 Faiza Zafar (born 1996), Pakistani squash player
 Fayza Ahmed (1934–1983), Arab singer

See also 
 Faizan
 Faiz
 Arabic name
 Pfizer

Arabic feminine given names